The 1920 Georgia Bulldogs football team represented the Georgia Bulldogs of the University of Georgia during the 1920 Southern Intercollegiate Athletic Association football season. The Bulldogs had an 8–0–1 record, outscored opponents 250–17, and were also co-champion of the Southern Intercollegiate Athletic Association, with in-state rival Georgia Tech as well as Tulane, which were also undefeated in conference play.

Georgia gave Furman their only loss, and did the same to Alabama in the year's biggest win.    This was the Georgia Bulldogs' first season under the guidance of head coach Herman Stegeman and the team's second undefeated season in its history (first since 1896 under Pop Warner). The Bulldogs were retroactively awarded a national championship by Clyde Berryman.

Before the season
The Bulldogs were led by first-year head coach Herman Stegeman, who attended the University of Chicago and learned football from the legendary Amos Alonzo Stagg. During the end of World War I, the United States Army stationed Stegeman in Athens to create physical training courses for the UGA Reserve Officers' Training Corps program.  Last season, Stegeman was hired by head coach Alex Cunningham as an assistant. Cunningham then went into the Army, and Stegeman was promoted to head coach. Stegeman was assisted by backfield coach and Warner disciple Jimmy DeHart.

Georgia became known for its line during the early 1920s, this season returning All-Southerns in end Owen Reynolds, tackle Artie Pew,  and center and captain Bum Day; as well as guard Hugh Whelchel and a young Joe Bennett. In 1920, the Bulldogs line was complemented with a strong backfield, led by Buck Cheves and known as the "Ten Second Backfield."

Schedule

Season summary

Week 1: The Citadel
The Bulldogs opened the season with a 40–0 defeat of The Citadel. Citadel made one first down. The first score was a 60-yard run by Hartley.

Week 2: at South Carolina

In the second week of play, Georgia easily defeated the South Carolina Gamecocks 37–0, "principally through the ability of Hartley and Cheves to advance the ball by long runs". Hartley returned the second-half kickoff back 95 yards for a touchdown, and had another 75-yard touchdown run two minutes later.

The starting lineup was: Reynolds (left end), J. Bennett (left tackle), Anthony (left guard), Day (center), Murray (right guard), Pew (right tackle), Owens (right end), Cheves (quarterback), Echols (left halfback), Hartley (right halfback), Collings (fullback).

Week 3: at Furman

A close-fought game with coach Billy Laval's  Speedy Speer-led Furman Purple Hurricane brought the Bulldogs a 7–0 win and Furman's only loss on the year.  Georgia scored thanks to a pass from Buck Cheves to Sheldon Fitts. A punting duel with Milton McManaway and Dave Collings featured throughout.

Week 4: at Oglethorpe
Georgia beat the Oglethorpe Stormy Petrels 27–3. Oglethorpe's captain Knox scored the season's first points on the Bulldogs.

Week 5: Auburn

The Bulldogs upset the Auburn Tigers 7–0, getting revenge for last year's loss. The only  touchdown of the game was a 20-yard pass from Buck Cheves to Dick Hartley. Frank Stubbs starred for Auburn. Artie Pew was ejected for slugging, and thus missed his chance to go out with an Auburn victory.

The starting lineup was: Reynolds (left end), Pew (left tackle), Whelchel (left guard), Day (center), Vandiver (right guard), J. Bennett (right tackle), P. Bennett (right end), Cheves (quarterback), Hartley (left halfback), Collings (right halfback), Echols (fullback).

Week 6: at Virginia

The aerial attack of the Virginia Orange and Blue met a staunch Georgia defense as the two teams fought to a scoreless tie in Charlottesville. Owen Reynolds and Paige Bennett starred for Georgia.

The starting lineup was: Reynolds (left end), Pew (left tackle), Whelchel (left guard), Day (center), Vandiver (right guard), Anthony (right tackle), P. Bennett (right end), Cheves (quarterback), Collins (left halfback), Hartley (right halfback), Tanner (fullback).

Week 7: Florida

Georgia rolled up a large 56–0 score on the Florida Gators. Florida put up a hard fight until Georgia got its first touchdown across, pouring it on from there. Quarterback Sheldon Fitts was the star of the contest. Fitts and Bohren scored two touchdowns. Paige Bennett, Hartley, Echols, and Collings had one each. Owen Reynolds starred again.

The starting lineup was: Reynolds (left end), J. Bennett (left tackle), Whelchel (left guard), Day (center), Vandiver (right guard), Pew (right tackle), P. Bennett (right end), Pitts (quarterback), Collins (left halfback), Hartley (right halfback), Echols (fullback).

Week 8: Alabama

The key win for the conference title was the 21–14 victory over the Alabama Crimson Tide. None of Georgia's touchdowns were scored by the offense.

Paige Bennett recovered a Mullie Lenoir fumble and ran 40 yards for a touchdown. Artie Pew kicked goal. On the next possession, Hugh Whelchel blocked a Riggs Stephenson punt , and Pew picked up the ball running 24 yards to score, kicking his own goal.  On the next drive, Lenoir scored.  In the third quarter, Al Clemens caught a tipped ball, and ran down the sidelines with a wall of blockers for the tying score. Late in the final period, Georgia's O'Connor tried a drop kick which was blocked by Whelchel. Buck Cheves recovered the ball and ran 87 yards for the touchdown  Again Pew converted goal. The recovery by Cheves ranked fourth in The 50 Greatest Plays In Georgia Bulldogs Football History.

The starting lineup was: Reynolds (left end), J. Bennett (left tackle), Vandiver (left guard), Day (center), Whelchel (right guard), Pew (right tackle), P. Bennett (Right end), Pitts (quarterback), Collins (left halfback), Hartley (right halfback), Echols (fullback).

Week 9: Clemson

Cheves and Hartley starred again in a 55–0 romp over Clemson to end the season. Dave Collings was the star of the contest scoring two touchdowns. The starting lineup was Reynolds (left end), J. Bennett (left tackle), Whelchel (left guard), Day (center), Anthony (right guard), Pew (right tackle), P. Bennett (Right end), Cheves (quarterback), Hartley (left halfback), Collings (right halfback), Echols (fullback).

Post season
Owen Reynolds was elected captain for next year. Reynolds, Pew, and Day were all composite All-Southern selections. Whelchel also made several selections, and Joe Bennett made one.

Rooters on either side of Georgia were happy as both the Bulldogs and Georgia Tech claimed SIAA titles. The Bulldogs were retroactively named the national champion for 1920 under the Berryman QPRS methodology.

Personnel

Roster

Line

Backfield

Unlisted

Scoring leaders
The following is an incomplete list of statistics and scores, largely dependent on newspaper summaries.

See also
 1920 College Football All-Southern Team

References

Additional sources
 

Georgia
Georgia Bulldogs football seasons
College football undefeated seasons
Georgia Bulldogs football